Nar Bahadur Saud (born 16 February,1963) is an agriculturist and Madan Puraskar–winning writer. Saud is paralyzed from the waist down because of a road accident. Wheel-chair bound, he worked on a book for ten years. The book was published in 2009 and won the Madan Puraskar for the same year. 

He graduated in agriculture from Palampur in India and started work as an officer in the National Agriculture Research Council. Before the accident, he was working as a Technical Officer of Dairy Development Corporation.

Biography 
He was born as the first child of mother Dharma Devi Saud and father Dhan Bahadur Saud on 16 February 1963 (4 Falgun 2019 BS) in the rural Baitadi district of Nepal. He completed his studies up to SLC in the village school. After completing his ISc. studies from Rampur-based Agricultural Science Campus in Chitwan, he went to Himachal Pradesh in India to graduate in Agricultural Science on a Government Scholarship. 

After completing his studies, he worked for one year at the Nepal Agricultural Research Council (NARC) in Khumaltar. In 2048 BS, he was transferred to Dairy Development Corporation. While on duty, he traveled from Butwal to Surkhet to participate in a project program in Surkhet but during the night, his vehicle met with an accident at Banke's Kasum. He suffered serious injuries to his lower body.

Notable works 
In 2009, he published a book called Nepalko Balinali ra Tinko Digo Kheti, for which he was awarded with the prestigious Madan Puraskar.

See also 

 Bhagiraj Ingnam
 Satya Mohan Joshi
 Chittaranjan Nepali

References

Living people
Nepalese male writers
Nepali-language writers
Madan Puraskar winners
Nepalese non-fiction writers
1963 births
People with paraplegia